aarF domain containing kinase 3 is a protein that in humans is encoded by the ADCK3 gene.

This gene encodes a mitochondrial protein similar to yeast ABC1, which functions in an electron-transferring membrane protein complex in the respiratory chain. It is not related to the family of ABC transporter proteins. Expression of this gene is induced by the tumor suppressor p53 and in response to DNA damage, and inhibiting its expression partially suppresses p53-induced apoptosis. Alternatively spliced transcript variants have been found; however, their full-length nature has not been determined.

References

External links

Further reading